Monster Madness may refer to:

 Cinemassacre's Monster Madness, a marathon of horror film reviews by James Rolfe from 2007 to 2021
 Monster Madness (album), a 2000 compilation album of heavy metal hits
 Monster Madness: Battle for Suburbia, a 2007 Xbox 360 and PC video game
 Monster Madness: Grave Danger, a 2008 PlayStation 3 video game
 Monster Madness, a comic magazine by Stan Lee, published by Magazine Management
 Monster Madness, a horror anthology by Crypt TV
 "Monster Madness", several tracks on the Mourning Noise album Death Trip Delivery: 1981–1985

See also